Cottage Grove Lake is a reservoir on the Coast Fork Willamette River in Lane County, Oregon, United States.

It was completed in 1942 as one of the 13 dams built by the United States Army Corps of Engineers in the Willamette River basin.

The dam's main function, in conjunction with the Dorena Dam on the Row River, a Coast Willamette tributary, is flood control. Other functions are to supply water for irrigation and improved river navigation. The lake and its surrounds are used for recreation, including boating, camping, fishing, picnicking, and bird-watching.

See also 
 List of lakes in Oregon

References

Dams in Oregon
United States Army Corps of Engineers dams
Reservoirs in Oregon
Lakes of Lane County, Oregon
Buildings and structures in Lane County, Oregon
Dams completed in 1942
1942 establishments in Oregon